Igor Duljaj (born 29 October 1979) is a Serbian former professional footballer who played as a defensive midfielder. He is best remembered for his tenacious playing style and stamina. He is currently the head coach of Serbian SuperLiga club Partizan. 

During his footballing career, Duljaj played with only three clubs, namely Partizan, Shakhtar Donetsk and Sevastopol. He won 14 major trophies at club level, including the 2008–09 UEFA Cup.

At international level, Duljaj earned 47 caps for Serbia (and its predecessors). He represented Serbia and Montenegro at the 2006 FIFA World Cup.

Club career
Born in Topola, Duljaj was spotted by Partizan in 1990. He initially traveled to Belgrade to attend training sessions for several years, before permanently relocating to the capital city. Duljaj is probably the best defensive midfielder who came out of the youth academy of Partizan in the 90s as he passed all club selections. In the 1997–98 season, Duljaj was promoted to the main squad, appearing in five league games and scoring once. He became a first-team regular in his third year as a senior, collecting 41 appearances in all competitions while scoring one goal in the league. Over the course of the next three seasons, Duljaj was an irreplaceable member of the team that won one national cup and back-to-back championships in 2002 and 2003. He subsequently helped the side progress to the group stage of the 2003–04 UEFA Champions League, eliminating Newcastle United in the last qualifying round.

In February 2004, Duljaj was transferred to Shakhtar Donetsk. He penned a five-year contract with the club, rejoining his former Partizan teammate Zvonimir Vukić. Over the following seven seasons, Duljaj won four Ukrainian Premier League titles, two Ukrainian Cups, two Ukrainian Super Cups, and one UEFA Cup. He amassed a total of 195 appearances in all competitions and scored six goals.

In July 2010, Duljaj signed with fellow Ukrainian club Sevastopol. He spent four seasons with the side, two in the top flight and two in the second tier, before retiring from the game.

International career
Duljaj was capped for FR Yugoslavia at under-18 and under-21 level. He also represented the country at the Millennium Super Soccer Cup in early 2001. Led by manager Ilija Petković, Duljaj appeared in all five of his team's games and scored two goals, helping the side win the tournament. However, these caps are not officially recognized by FIFA.

Previously, Duljaj made his full international debut for FR Yugoslavia in a 2–1 friendly loss against Romania on 15 November 2000. He went on to represent his country on 47 occasions, being a member of the team at the 2006 FIFA World Cup.

Post-playing career
In the summer of 2016, Duljaj joined the coaching staff at Shakhtar Donetsk, becoming an assistant to manager Paulo Fonseca.

In December 2019, it was announced that Duljaj would be joining Savo Milošević's staff at Partizan.

On 16 August 2022, it was announced that Duljaj became the new manager at Teleoptik.

Personal life
Duljaj has two brothers, Joakim and Nenad. Together they run the Duljaj Football Academy in their hometown of Topola.

Career statistics

Club

International

Managerial statistics 
As of 18 March 2023

Honours

Club
Partizan
 First League of FR Yugoslavia: 1998–99, 2001–02, 2002–03
 FR Yugoslavia Cup: 1997–98, 2000–01
Shakhtar Donetsk
 Ukrainian Premier League: 2004–05, 2005–06, 2007–08, 2009–10
 Ukrainian Cup: 2003–04, 2007–08
 Ukrainian Super Cup: 2005, 2008
 UEFA Cup: 2008–09
Sevastopol
 Ukrainian First League: 2012–13

Individual
 FK Partizan Player of the Year: 2003

References

External links

 Duljaj Football Academy
 
 
 
 

2006 FIFA World Cup players
Association football midfielders
Expatriate footballers in Ukraine
FC Sevastopol players
FC Shakhtar Donetsk non-playing staff
FC Shakhtar Donetsk players
First League of Serbia and Montenegro players
FK Partizan non-playing staff
FK Partizan players
Gorani people
People from Topola
Serbia and Montenegro expatriate footballers
Serbia and Montenegro expatriate sportspeople in Ukraine
Serbia and Montenegro footballers
Serbia and Montenegro international footballers
Serbia and Montenegro under-21 international footballers
Serbia international footballers
Serbian expatriate footballers
Serbian expatriate sportspeople in Ukraine
Serbian footballers
UEFA Cup winning players
Ukrainian Premier League players
1979 births
Living people